TDN may refer to:

 ISO 639-3 code for Tondano language
 Naval Aircraft Factory TDN, a target drone produced by the U.S. Naval Aircraft Factory during the Second World War
 Televisa Deportes Network, a Mexican television sports channel
 Three Dog Night, American rock group
 1,1,6-Trimethyl-1,2-dihydronaphthalene, an aroma compound in wine
 Turkish Daily News, an English language newspaper in Turkey